The Java programming language XML APIs developed by Sun Microsystems consist of the following separate  computer-programming APIs:

 Java API for XML Processing, or JAXP
 Java API for XML Messaging, or JAXM
 Jakarta XML RPC, or JAX-RPC — formerly Java API for XML Based RPC deprecated for Java API for XML Web Services
 Jakarta XML Registries, or JAXR — formerly Java API for XML Registries
 Jakarta XML Web Services, or JAX-WS — formerly Java API for XML Web Services
 Jakarta RESTful Web Services, or JAX-RS — formerly Java API for RESTful Web Services
 Java API for XQuery, or XQJ
 Jakarta XML Binding, or JAXB — formerly Java Architecture for XML Binding (this was its official Sun name, even though it is an API, see )
 Streaming XML processing, or StAX (compatible with JDK 1.4 and above, included in JDK 1.6)

Only the Java API for XML Processing (JAXP) is a required API in Enterprise Java Beans Specification 1.3.

A number of different open-source software packages implement these APIs:

 Xerces — One of the original and most popular SAX and DOM parsers
 Xalan — XSLT/XPath implementation, included in JDK 1.4 and above as the default transformer (XSLT 1.0)
 Saxon — alternative highly specification-compliant XSLT/XPath/XQuery processor (supports both XSLT 1.0 and 2.0)
 Woodstox — An open-source StAX and SAX (as of version 3.2) implementation

External links 
 StelsXML JDBC driver - JDBC driver for XML files.
 Woodstox - Woodstox home page.
 How To Schema Check Xml Via JAXB - Rob Austin
 Java EE and web framework tutorials - Learning xml in java.

 
XML